The county of Somerset
is divided into 5 parliamentary constituencies,
which are all county constituencies.

Constituencies

2010 boundary changes

Under the Fifth Periodic Review of Westminster constituencies, the Boundary Commission for England decided to retain Somerset's constituencies for the 2010 election, making minor changes to realign constituency boundaries with the boundaries of current local government wards, and to reduce the electoral disparity between constituencies. In two cases the changes meant that the constituencies were renamed.

Proposed boundary changes 
See 2023 Periodic Review of Westminster constituencies for further details.

Following the abandonment of the Sixth Periodic Review (the 2018 review), the Boundary Commission for England formally launched the 2023 Review on 5 January 2021. Initial proposals were published on 8 June 2021 and, following two periods of public consultation, revised proposals were published on 8 November 2022. Final proposals will be published by 1 July 2023.

The commission has proposed that Somerset be combined with Avon and Devon as a sub-region of the South West Region, resulting in significant change to the existing pattern of constituencies. In Somerset, only the constituency of Yeovil retains its name with relatively minor changes. The proposals include the cross-county boundary constituencies of Frome, Wells and the Mendips, and Tiverton and Minehead. The following seats are proposed:

Containing electoral wards from Mendip

 Frome (part)1
 Glastonbury and Somerton (part)
 Wells and Mendip Hills (part)2

Containing electoral wards from Sedgemoor

 Bridgwater
 Wells and Mendip Hills (part)2

Containing electoral wards from Somerset West and Taunton

 Taunton
 Tiverton and Minehead (part)3

Containing electoral wards from South Somerset

 Frome (part)1
 Glastonbury and Somerton (part)
 Yeovil

1Also contains electoral wards in the District of Bath and North East Somerset

2Also contains electoral wards in the District of North Somerset

3Also contains electoral wards in the Devon District of Mid Devon

Results history 
Primary data source: House of Commons research briefing - General election results from 1918 to 2019

2019 
The number of votes cast for each political party who fielded candidates in constituencies comprising Somerset in the 2019 general election were as follows:

Percentage votes 
Note that before 1983 Somerset was analysed under its Ceremonial definition (including the southern part of what became analysed at boundary reviews as Avon, see Avon's list of seats).

1pre-1979: Liberal Party; 1983 & 1987: SDP-Liberal Alliance

* Included in Other

Seats 

11983 & 1987 - SDP-Liberal Alliance

Maps

Historical representation by party
A cell marked → (with a different colour background to the preceding cell) indicates that the previous MP continued to sit under a new party name.

1885 to 1918 (10 MPs)

1918 to 1950 (7 MPs)

1950 to 1983 (7 MPs)

1983 to present (5 MPs)

See also
 List of constituencies in South West England
 List of parliamentary constituencies in Avon for those covering the Bath and North East Somerset and North Somerset unitary authorities.

Notes

References

 
 Somerset
Somerset
 
Parliamentary constituencies